Spark Bridge is a former mill village in Cumbria, England, within the Lake District National Park, and within the historic boundaries of Lancashire. The village is situated away from the main road on the river Crake which flows from Coniston Water to Morecambe Bay at Greenodd. The village green which is next to and gives access to the river is in the middle of the village surrounded by well maintained white painted cottages.

Facilities 

There are two public houses, The Royal Oak Inn at the centre of the village, and The Farmers Arms, a listed building rescued in 2021 by local arts charity Grizedale Arts, supported by loan stock investors and local and international donors. The diversified pub now offers crafts classes, talks and events and a holiday apartment as well as a bar, restaurant, cafe and outdoor pizza oven. The village also has its own postbox, a telephone box and a bus stop. The bus X 12 runs Monday to Saturday to Coniston or in the other direction to Ulverston and Barrow in Furness.

Canoeists use the village green to leave the river at this point, often using the nearby village hall as a base.

River Crake 
The River Crake passes from Coniston Water four miles away through Spark Bridge en route to the Leven Estuary.

In November 2009 many of the tributaries feeding the River Crake overflowed, feeding water on the local road network. It was described as a once in a thousand-year flooding event by the Environment Agency. Cumbria Police closed the main bridge on Thursday night around 7 p.m. to all on foot and in cars, they feared that the damage could have been caused to the bridge but a later examination showed that it was undamaged.

External links

Villages in Cumbria
South Lakeland District